John H. Pencavel is a British economist and academic, currently serving as Levin Professor of Economics (Emeritus) at Stanford University, having been at the institution since 1969. He is a Fellow of the Econometric Society (1993), Fellow of University College London (2001), Fellow of the Society of Labor Economists (2004), and Distinguished Fellow of the American Economic Association.

Career
Pencavel grew up in Hanwell, West London, attending Drayton Manor Grammar School. He then went on to read Economics at University College London, gaining both a BSc (1965) and MSc (1966), before receiving his PhD from Princeton University in 1969.

In 2005, he was made President of the Society of Labor Economists, and in 2014 was made President of the Western Economic Association.

Pencavel's major contributions lie within labour economics, focussing on behavioural models of trade unions, and modelling worker cooperatives. Pencavel is also the creator of the JEL Classification System, used in an amended form by the AEA to this day.

Awards
Pencavel was awarded a Guggenheim Fellowship in 1978, and the Jacob Mincer Award for lifetime contributions to labour economics in 2008.

References

20th-century  British  economists
21st-century  British economists
Alumni of University College London
Econometricians
Fellows of the Econometric Society
Labor economists
Living people
People educated at Drayton Manor High School
People from Hanwell
Princeton University alumni
Stanford University faculty
Year of birth missing (living people)